Saffron is a spice derived from the flower of Crocus sativus, commonly known as the "saffron crocus". The vivid crimson stigma called threads, are collected and dried for use mainly as a seasoning and colouring agent in food. Although some doubts remain on its origin, it is believed that saffron originated in Iran. However, Greece and Mesopotamia have also been suggested as the possible region of origin of this plant. Saffron crocus slowly propagated throughout much of Eurasia and was later brought to parts of North Africa, North America, and Oceania.

Saffron's taste and iodoform-like or hay-like fragrance result from the phytochemicals picrocrocin and safranal. It also contains a carotenoid pigment, crocin, which imparts a rich golden-yellow hue to dishes and textiles. Its recorded history is attested in a 7th-century BC Assyrian botanical treatise, and it has been traded and used for thousands of years. In the 21st century, Iran produces some 90% of the world total for saffron. At US$5,000 per kg or higher, saffron has long been the world's costliest spice by weight.

Etymology

A degree of uncertainty surrounds the origin of the English word "saffron". It might stem from the 12th-century Old French term safran, which comes from the Latin word , from the Arabic (زَعْفَرَان), za'farān, which comes from the Persian word zarparan meaning "gold strung" (implying either the golden stamens of the flower or the golden color it creates when used as flavor).

Species

Description

The domesticated saffron crocus, Crocus sativus, is an autumn-flowering perennial plant unknown in the wild. It probably descends from the eastern Mediterranean autumn-flowering Crocus cartwrightianus which is also known as "wild saffron" and originated in Crete or Central Asia. C. thomasii and C. pallasii are other possible sources. As a genetically monomorphic clone, it slowly propagated throughout much of Eurasia.

It is a sterile triploid form, which means that three homologous sets of chromosomes make up each specimen's genetic complement; C. sativus bears eight chromosomal bodies per set, making for 24 in total. Being sterile, the purple flowers of C. sativus fail to produce viable seeds; reproduction hinges on human assistance: clusters of corms, underground, bulb-like, starch-storing organs, must be dug up, divided, and replanted. A corm survives for one season, producing via vegetative division up to ten "cormlets" that can grow into new plants in the next season.

The plant sprouts 5–11 white and non-photosynthetic leaves known as cataphylls. These membrane-like structures cover and protect 5 to 11 true leaves as they bud and develop on the crocus flower. C. sativus cataphylls are suspected by some to manifest prior to blooming when the plant is irrigated relatively early in the growing season. Its floral axes, or flower-bearing structures, bear bracteoles, or specialised leaves, that sprout from the flower stems; the latter are known as pedicels. Only in October, after most other flowering plants have released their seeds, do its brilliantly hued flowers develop; they range from a light pastel shade of lilac to a darker and more striated mauve. The flowers possess a sweet, honey-like fragrance. A three-pronged style  in length, emerges from each flower. Each prong terminates with a vivid crimson stigma, which are the distal end of a carpel.

Cultivation

The saffron crocus, unknown in the wild, probably descends from Crocus cartwrightianus. It is a triploid that is "self-incompatible" and male sterile; it undergoes aberrant meiosis and is hence incapable of independent sexual reproduction—all propagation is by vegetative multiplication via manual "divide-and-set" of a starter clone or by interspecific hybridisation.

Crocus sativus thrives in the Mediterranean maquis, an ecotype superficially resembling the North American chaparral, and similar climates where hot and dry summer breezes sweep semi-arid lands. Some reports suggest saffron can tolerate an air temperature range from –22 to 40 °C. Irrigation is required if grown outside of moist environments such as Kashmir, where annual rainfall averages ; saffron-growing regions in Greece ( annually) and Spain are far drier than the main cultivating Iranian regions. What makes this possible is the timing of the local wet seasons; generous spring rains and drier summers are optimal. Rain immediately preceding flowering boosts saffron yields; rainy or cold weather during flowering promotes disease and reduces yields. Persistently damp and hot conditions harm the crops, and rabbits, rats, and birds cause damage by digging up corms. Nematodes, leaf rusts, and corm rot pose other threats. Yet Bacillus subtilis inoculation may provide some benefit to growers by speeding corm growth and increasing stigma biomass yield.

The plants fare poorly in shady conditions; they grow best in full sunlight. Fields that slope towards the sunlight are optimal (i.e., south-sloping in the Northern Hemisphere). Planting depth and corm spacing, in concert with climate, are critical factors in determining yields. Mother corms planted deeper yield higher-quality saffron, though they form fewer flower buds and daughter corms. Greek, Moroccan, and Spanish growers employ distinct depths and spacings that suit their locales.

C. sativus prefers friable, loose, low-density, well-watered, and well-drained clay-calcareous soils with high organic content. Traditional raised beds promote good drainage. Afterwards, and with no further manure application, corms were planted. After a period of dormancy through the summer, the corms send up their narrow leaves and begin to bud in early autumn. Only in mid-autumn do they flower. Harvests are by necessity a speedy affair: after blossoming at dawn, flowers quickly wilt as the day passes. All plants bloom within a window of one or two weeks. Stigmas are dried quickly upon extraction and (preferably) sealed in airtight containers.

Harvesting

The high retail value of saffron is maintained on world markets because of labour-intensive harvesting methods, which require some  – equivalently, . Forty hours of labour are needed to pick 150,000 flowers.

One freshly picked crocus flower yields on average 30 mg of fresh saffron or 7 mg dried; roughly 150 flowers yield  of dry saffron threads; to produce  of dried saffron,  of flowers are needed; the yield of dried spice from fresh saffron is only .

Spice

Phytochemistry and sensory properties

Saffron contains some 28 volatile and aroma-yielding compounds, dominated by ketones and aldehydes. Its main aroma-active compounds are safranal – the main compound responsible for saffron aroma – 4-ketoisophorone, and dihydrooxophorone. Saffron also contains nonvolatile phytochemicals, including the carotenoids zeaxanthin, lycopene, various α- and β-carotenes, as well as crocetin and its glycoside crocein, which are the most biologically active components. Because crocetin is smaller and more water-soluble than the other carotenoids, it is more rapidly absorbed.

The yellow-orange colour of saffron is primarily the result of α-crocin. This crocin is trans-crocetin di-(β-D-gentiobiosyl) ester; it bears the systematic (IUPAC) name 8,8-diapo-8,8-carotenoic acid. This means that the crocin underlying saffron's aroma is a digentiobiose ester of the carotenoid crocetin. Crocins themselves are a series of hydrophilic carotenoids that are either monoglycosyl or diglycosyl polyene esters of crocetin. Crocetin is a conjugated polyene dicarboxylic acid that is hydrophobic, and thus oil-soluble. When crocetin is esterified with two water-soluble gentiobioses, which are sugars, a product results that is itself water-soluble. The resultant α-crocin is a carotenoid pigment that may make up more than 10% of dry saffron's mass. The two esterified gentiobioses make α-crocin ideal for colouring water-based and non-fatty foods such as rice dishes.

The bitter glucoside picrocrocin is responsible for saffron's pungent flavour. Picrocrocin (chemical formula: ; systematic name: 4-(β-D-glucopyranosyloxy)-2,6,6-trimethylcyclohex-1-ene-1-carbaldehyde) is a union of an aldehyde sub-molecule known as safranal (systematic name: 2,6,6-trimethylcyclohexa-1,3-diene-1-carbaldehyde) and a carbohydrate. It has insecticidal and pesticidal properties, and may comprise up to 4% of dry saffron. Picrocrocin is a truncated version of the carotenoid zeaxanthin that is produced via oxidative cleavage, and is the glycoside of the terpene aldehyde safranal.

When saffron is dried after its harvest, the heat, combined with enzymatic action, splits picrocrocin to yield D–glucose and a free safranal molecule. Safranal, a volatile oil, gives saffron much of its distinctive aroma. Safranal is less bitter than picrocrocin and may comprise up to 70% of dry saffron's volatile fraction in some samples. A second molecule underlying saffron's aroma is 2-hydroxy-4,4,6-trimethyl-2,5-cyclohexadien-1-one, which produces a scent described as saffron, dried hay-like. Chemists find this is the most powerful contributor to saffron's fragrance, despite its presence in a lesser quantity than safranal. Dry saffron is highly sensitive to fluctuating pH levels, and rapidly breaks down chemically in the presence of light and oxidising agents. It must, therefore, be stored away in air-tight containers to minimise contact with atmospheric oxygen. Saffron is somewhat more resistant to heat.

Grades and ISO 3632 categories

Saffron is not all of the same quality and strength. Strength is related to several factors including the amount of style picked along with the red stigma. Age of the saffron is also a factor. More style included means the saffron is less strong gram for gram because the colour and flavour are concentrated in the red stigmas. Saffron from Iran, Spain and Kashmir is classified into various grades according to the relative amounts of red stigma and yellow styles it contains. Grades of Iranian saffron are: sargol (red stigma tips only, strongest grade), pushal or pushali (red stigmas plus some yellow style, lower strength), "bunch" saffron (red stigmas plus large amount of yellow style, presented in a tiny bundle like a miniature wheatsheaf) and konge (yellow style only, claimed to have aroma but with very little, if any, colouring potential). Grades of Spanish saffron are coupé (the strongest grade, like Iranian sargol), mancha (like Iranian pushal), and in order of further decreasing strength rio, standard and sierra saffron. The word mancha in the Spanish classification can have two meanings: a general grade of saffron or a very high quality Spanish-grown saffron from a specific geographical origin. Real Spanish-grown La Mancha saffron has PDO protected status and this is displayed on the product packaging. Spanish growers fought hard for Protected Status because they felt that imports of Iranian saffron re-packaged in Spain and sold as "Spanish Mancha saffron" were undermining the genuine La Mancha brand. Similar was the case in Kashmir where imported Iranian saffron is mixed with local saffron and sold as "Kashmir brand" at a higher price. In Kashmir, saffron is mostly classified into two main categories called mongra (stigma alone) and lachha (stigmas attached with parts of the style). Countries producing less saffron do not have specialised words for different grades and may only produce one grade. Artisan producers in Europe and New Zealand have offset their higher labour charges for saffron harvesting by targeting quality, only offering extremely high-grade saffron.

In addition to descriptions based on how the saffron is picked, saffron may be categorised under the international standard ISO 3632 after laboratory measurement of crocin (responsible for saffron's colour), picrocrocin (taste), and safranal (fragrance or aroma) content. However, often there is no clear grading information on the product packaging and little of the saffron readily available in the UK is labelled with ISO category. This lack of information makes it hard for customers to make informed choices when comparing prices and buying saffron.

Under ISO 3632, determination of non-stigma content ("floral waste content") and other extraneous matter such as inorganic material ("ash") are also key. Grading standards are set by the International Organization for Standardization, a federation of national standards bodies. ISO 3632 deals exclusively with saffron and establishes three categories: III (poorest quality), II, and I (finest quality). Formerly there was also category IV, which was below category III. Samples are assigned categories by gauging the spice's crocin and picrocrocin content, revealed by measurements of specific spectrophotometric absorbance. Safranal is treated slightly differently and rather than there being threshold levels for each category, samples must give a reading of 20–50 for all categories.

These data are measured through spectrophotometry reports at certified testing laboratories worldwide. Higher absorbances imply greater levels of crocin, picrocrocin and safranal, and thus a greater colouring potential and therefore strength per gram. The absorbance reading of crocin is known as the "colouring strength" of that saffron. Saffron's colouring strength can range from lower than 80 (for all category IV saffron) up to 200 or greater (for category I). The world's finest samples (the selected, most red-maroon, tips of stigmas picked from the finest flowers) receive colouring strengths in excess of 250, making such saffron over three times more powerful than category IV saffron. Market prices for saffron types follow directly from these ISO categories. Sargol and coupé saffron would typically fall into ISO 3632 category I. Pushal and Mancha would probably be assigned to category II. On many saffron packaging labels, neither the ISO 3632 category nor the colouring strength (the measurement of crocin content) is displayed.

However, many growers, traders, and consumers reject such lab test numbers. Some people prefer a more holistic method of sampling batches of threads for taste, aroma, pliability, and other traits in a fashion similar to that practised by experienced wine tasters. However, ISO 3632 grade and colouring strength information allow consumers to make instant comparisons between the quality of different saffron brands, without needing to purchase and sample the saffron. In particular, consumers can work out a value for money based on price per unit of colouring strength rather than price per gram, given the wide possible range of colouring strengths that different kinds of saffron can have.

Adulteration
Despite attempts at quality control and standardisation, an extensive history of saffron adulteration, particularly among the cheapest grades, continues into modern times. Adulteration was first documented in Europe's Middle Ages, when those found selling adulterated saffron were executed under the Safranschou code. Typical methods include mixing in extraneous substances like beetroot, pomegranate fibres, red-dyed silk fibres, or the saffron crocus's tasteless and odourless yellow stamens. Other methods included dousing saffron fibres with viscid substances like honey or vegetable oil to increase their weight. Powdered saffron is more prone to adulteration, with turmeric, paprika, and other powders used as diluting fillers. Adulteration can also consist of selling mislabelled mixes of different saffron grades. Thus, high-grade Kashmiri saffron is often sold and mixed with cheaper Iranian imports; these mixes are then marketed as pure Kashmiri saffron, a development that has cost Kashmiri growers much of their income. Safflower is a common substitute sometimes sold as saffron. The spice is reportedly counterfeited with horse hair, corn silk, or shredded paper. Tartrazine or sunset yellow have been used to colour counterfeit powdered saffron.

In recent years, saffron adulterated with the colouring extract of gardenia fruits has been detected in the European market. This form of fraud is difficult to detect due to the presence of flavonoids and crocines in the gardenia-extracts similar to those naturally occurring in saffron. Detection methods have been developed by using HPLC and mass spectrometry to determine the presence of geniposide, a compound present in the fruits of gardenia, but not in saffron.

Types

The various saffron crocus cultivars give rise to thread types that are often regionally distributed and characteristically distinct. Varieties (not varieties in the botanical sense) from Spain, including the tradenames "Spanish Superior" and "Creme", are generally mellower in colour, flavour, and aroma; they are graded by government-imposed standards. Italian varieties are slightly more potent than Spanish. Greek saffron produced in the town of Krokos is PDO protected due to its particularly high-quality colour and strong flavour. Various "boutique" crops are available from New Zealand, France, Switzerland, England, the United States, and other countries—some of them organically grown. In the US, Pennsylvania Dutch saffron—known for its "earthy" notes—is marketed in small quantities.

Consumers may regard certain cultivars as "premium" quality. The "Aquila" saffron, or zafferano dell'Aquila, is defined by high safranal and crocin content, distinctive thread shape, unusually pungent aroma, and intense colour; it is grown exclusively on eight hectares in the Navelli Valley of Italy's Abruzzo region, near L'Aquila. It was first introduced to Italy by a Dominican friar from inquisition-era Spain. But the biggest saffron cultivation in Italy is in San Gavino Monreale, Sardinia, where it is grown on 40 hectares, representing 60% of Italian production; it too has unusually high crocin, picrocrocin, and safranal content.

Another is the "Mongra" or "Lacha" saffron of Kashmir (Crocus sativus 'Cashmirianus'), which is among the most difficult for consumers to obtain. Repeated droughts, blights, and crop failures in Kashmir combined with an Indian export ban, contribute to its prohibitive overseas prices. Kashmiri saffron is recognizable by its dark maroon-purple hue, making it among the world's darkest. In 2020, Kashmir Valley saffron was certified with a geographical indication from the Government of India.

World production

Almost all saffron grows in a belt from Spain in the west to Kashmir in the east. Iran is responsible for around 45% of global production. Afghanistan and Spain are secondary producers, while the United Arab Emirates, Greece, India and Morocco are among minor producers.

According to the latest statistics for saffron trade in 2019, Iran is the world’s largest producer of saffron, supplying 430 tons of the total 450 tons of saffron produced worldwide and is expected to reach 500 tons in 2020. India, producing only 22 tons of saffron annually, ranks second. Other countries producing saffron and based on their share in global saffron production include Greece (7.2 tons), Afghanistan (6 tons), Morocco (2.6 tons), Spain (2.3 tons), Italy (1 ton), China (1 ton), and Azerbaijan (0.23 ton).

Trade

Vivid crimson colouring, slight moistness, elasticity, and lack of broken-off thread debris are all traits of fresh saffron.

Uses

Saffron has a long history of use in traditional medicine. Saffron has also been used as a fabric dye, particularly in China and India, and in perfumery. It is used for religious purposes in India.

Consumption

Saffron's aroma is often described by connoisseurs as reminiscent of metallic honey with grassy or hay-like notes, while its taste has also been noted as hay-like and sweet. Saffron also contributes a luminous yellow-orange colouring to foods. Saffron is widely used in Persian, Indian, European, and Arab cuisines. Confectioneries and liquors also often include saffron. Saffron is used in dishes ranging from the jewelled rice and khoresh of Iran, the Milanese risotto of Italy, the paella of Spain, the bouillabaisse of France, to the biryani with various meat accompaniments in South Asia. One of the most esteemed use for saffron is in the preparation of the Golden Ham, a precious dry-cured ham made with saffron from San Gimignano. Common saffron substitutes include safflower (Carthamus tinctorius, which is often sold as "Portuguese saffron" or "açafrão"), annatto, and turmeric (Curcuma longa). In Medieval Europe, turmeric was also known as "Indian saffron" because of its yellow-orange color.

Nutrition
Dried saffron is 65% carbohydrates, 6% fat, 11% protein (table) and 12% water. In one tablespoon (2 grams; a quantity much larger than is likely to be ingested in normal use) manganese is present as 29% of the Daily Value, while other micronutrients have negligible content (table).

Toxicity
Mild toxicity includes dizziness, nausea, vomiting, and diarrhea, whereas at higher doses there can be reduced platelet count and spontaneous bleeding.

Storage
Saffron will not spoil, but will lose flavour within six months if not stored in an airtight, cool and dark place. Freezer storage can maintain flavour for up to two years.

Research
Genes and transcription factors involved in the pathway for carotenoid synthesis responsible for the colour, flavour and aroma of saffron were under study in 2017.

Saffron constituents, such as crocin, crocetin, and safranal, were under preliminary research for their potential to affect mental depression and low mood. Saffron has also been studied for its possible effect on cardiovascular risk factors, such as lipid profile, blood glucose, weight, eye health, and in erectile dysfunction, but there is no high-quality clinical evidence for such effects, as of 2020. Studies on saffron related to the therapeutic area of sleep have shown very encouraging results. Saffron has also been found to have positive effects on the psychological effects of menopause in women.

History

Some doubts remain on the origin of saffron, but it is believed that it originated in Iran. However, Greece and Mesopotamia have also been suggested as the possible region of origin. Harold McGee states that it was domesticated in or near Greece during the Bronze Age. C. sativus is possibly a triploid form of Crocus cartwrightianus, which is also known as "wild saffron". Saffron crocus slowly propagated throughout much of Eurasia and was later brought to parts of North Africa, North America, and Oceania.

West Asia
Saffron was detailed in a 7th-century BC Assyrian botanical reference compiled under Ashurbanipal. Documentation of saffron's use over the span of 3,500 years has been uncovered. Saffron-based pigments have indeed been found in 50,000-year-old depictions of prehistoric places in northwest Iran. The Sumerians later used wild-growing saffron in their remedies and magical potions. Saffron was an article of long-distance trade before the Minoan palace culture's 2nd millennium BC peak. Ancient Persians cultivated Persian saffron (Crocus sativus 'Hausknechtii') in Derbent, Isfahan, and Khorasan by the 10th century BC. At such sites, saffron threads were woven into textiles, ritually offered to divinities, and used in dyes, perfumes, medicines, and body washes. Saffron threads would thus be scattered across beds and mixed into hot teas as a curative for bouts of melancholy. Non-Persians also feared the Persians' usage of saffron as a drugging agent and aphrodisiac. During his Asian campaigns, Alexander the Great used Persian saffron in his infusions, rice, and baths as a curative for battle wounds. Alexander's troops imitated the practice from the Persians and brought saffron-bathing to Greece.

South Asia 

Conflicting theories explain saffron's arrival in South Asia. Kashmiri and Chinese accounts date its arrival anywhere between 2500 and 900 years ago. Historians studying ancient Persian records date the arrival to sometime prior to 500 BC, attributing it to a Persian transplantation of saffron corms to stock new gardens and parks. Phoenicians then marketed Kashmiri saffron as a dye and a treatment for melancholy. Its use in foods and dyes subsequently spread throughout South Asia. Buddhist monks wear saffron-coloured robes; however, the robes are not dyed with costly saffron but turmeric, a less expensive dye, or jackfruit. Monks' robes are dyed the same colour to show equality with each other, and turmeric or ochre were the cheapest, most readily available dyes. Gamboge is also used to dye the robes.

East Asia 
Some historians believe that saffron came to China with Mongol invaders from Persia. Yet it is mentioned in ancient Chinese medical texts, including the forty-volume Shennong Bencaojing, a pharmacopoeia written around 300–200 BC. Traditionally credited to the legendary Yan Emperor and the deity Shennong, it discusses 252 plant-based medical treatments for various disorders. Nevertheless, around the 3rd century AD, the Chinese were referring to it as having a Kashmiri provenance. According to the herbalist Wan Zhen, "the habitat of saffron is in Kashmir, where people grow it principally to offer it to the Buddha." Wan also reflected on how it was used in his time: "The flower withers after a few days, and then the saffron is obtained. It is valued for its uniform yellow colour. It can be used to aromatise wine."

South East Mediterranean
The Minoans portrayed saffron in their palace frescoes by 1600–1500 BC; they hint at its possible use as a therapeutic drug. Ancient Greek legends told of sea voyages to Cilicia, where adventurers sought what they believed were the world's most valuable threads. Another legend tells of Crocus and Smilax, whereby Crocus is bewitched and transformed into the first saffron crocus. Ancient perfumers in Egypt, physicians in Gaza, townspeople in Rhodes, and the Greek hetaerae courtesans used saffron in their scented waters, perfumes and potpourris, mascaras and ointments, divine offerings, and medical treatments.

In late Ptolemaic Egypt, Cleopatra used saffron in her baths so that lovemaking would be more pleasurable. Egyptian healers used saffron as a treatment for all varieties of gastrointestinal ailments. Saffron was also used as a fabric dye in such Levantine cities as Sidon and Tyre in Lebanon. Aulus Cornelius Celsus prescribes saffron in medicines for wounds, cough, colic, and scabies, and in the mithridatium.

Western Europe

Saffron was a notable ingredient in certain Roman recipes such as jusselle and conditum. Such was the Romans' love of saffron that Roman colonists took it with them when they settled in southern Gaul, where it was extensively cultivated until Rome's fall. With this fall, European saffron cultivation plummeted. Competing theories state that saffron only returned to France with 8th-century AD Moors or with the Avignon papacy in the 14th century AD. Similarly, the spread of Islamic civilisation may have helped reintroduce the crop to Spain and Italy.

The 14th-century Black Death caused demand for saffron-based medicaments to peak, and Europe imported large quantities of threads via Venetian and Genoan ships from southern and Mediterranean lands such as Rhodes. The theft of one such shipment by noblemen sparked the fourteen-week-long Saffron War. The conflict and resulting fear of rampant saffron piracy spurred corm cultivation in Basel; it thereby grew prosperous. The crop then spread to Nuremberg, where endemic and insalubrious adulteration brought on the Safranschou code—whereby culprits were variously fined, imprisoned, and executed. Meanwhile, cultivation continued in southern France, Italy, and Spain.

The Essex town of Saffron Walden, named for its new specialty crop, emerged as a prime saffron growing and trading centre in the 16th and 17th centuries but cultivation there was abandoned; saffron was re-introduced around 2013 as well as other parts of the UK (Cheshire).

The Americas
Europeans introduced saffron to the Americas when immigrant members of the Schwenkfelder Church left Europe with a trunk containing its corms. Church members had grown it widely in Europe. By 1730, the Pennsylvania Dutch cultivated saffron throughout eastern Pennsylvania. Spanish colonies in the Caribbean bought large amounts of this new American saffron, and high demand ensured that saffron's list price on the Philadelphia commodities exchange was equal to gold. Trade with the Caribbean later collapsed in the aftermath of the War of 1812, when many saffron-bearing merchant vessels were destroyed. Yet the Pennsylvania Dutch continued to grow lesser amounts of saffron for local trade and use in their cakes, noodles, and chicken or trout dishes. American saffron cultivation survives into modern times, mainly in Lancaster County, Pennsylvania.

Gallery

References

Bibliography

External links

 
 

 
Saffron
Food colorings
Incense material
Arab cuisine
Greek cuisine
Indian spices
Iranian cuisine
Iraqi cuisine
Spices
Spanish cuisine